Kıratlı (formerly Yukarıkıratlı) is a village in the Kozluk District, Batman Province, Turkey. Its population is 382 (2021).

References

Villages in Kozluk District

Kurdish settlements in Batman Province